Khaled Jarrar (born 1976) is a Palestinian artist, based in Ramallah, Palestine. Born in Jenin, his work explores the realities and impacts of Occupation and power struggle on the Palestinian lived experience, particularly in the West Bank. He completed his studies in 1996 in Interior Design at Palestine Polytechnic University, and worked as a bodyguard for PLO leader Yasser Arafat. He then worked as a carpenter, before graduating from the International Academy of Art Palestine in 2011. Jarrar's work takes the form of various media, including performance art, photography, sculpture and installations. His works have been exhibited internationally, including Ayyam Gallery, London, and Centre Pompidou, Paris.

Notable examples of his work include:

 State of Palestine (performance art) (2012)
 Whole in the Wall (2013)
 No Man's Land (2016)

References

Palestinian artists

1976 births

Living people